John Michael Mihalic (November 13, 1911 – April 24, 1987) was a Major League Baseball second baseman who played for the Washington Senators from  to .

External links

1911 births
1987 deaths
Major League Baseball second basemen
Washington Senators (1901–1960) players
Baseball players from Cleveland
Chattanooga Lookouts managers
People from Fort Oglethorpe, Georgia
Nashville Vols players
American expatriate baseball players in Canada
Jersey City Giants players
Minneapolis Millers (baseball) players
Toronto Maple Leafs (International League) players
Youngstown Buckeyes players